The FAI Cup 1936–37 was the sixteenth awarding of Ireland's premier cup competition prize, The Football Association of Ireland Challenge Cup or FAI Cup. The tournament began on 9 January 1937 and concluded on 18 April with the final held at Dalymount Park, Dublin. An official attendance of 24,000 people watched Waterford, captained by Tom Arrigan, claim their first FAI Cup title by defeating St James's Gate.

First round

Second round

Semi-finals

Final

Notes
A.  From 1923-1936, the FAI Cup was known as the Free State Cup.

B.  Attendances were calculated using gate receipts which limited their accuracy as a large proportion of people, particularly children, attended football matches in Ireland throughout the 20th century for free by a number of means.

C.  Fixture abandoned after 55 minutes due to bad weather. Re-Fixture played on 10 February.

References
General

External links
FAI Website

1936-37
FAI Cup
FAI Cup